A croustade is a French culinary term meaning a crust or pie-crust of any type. They are usually made of flaky pastry or puff pastry, but there are also bread croustades (croustade de pain de mie), potato croustades (petites croustades en pommes de terre duchesse), rice, semolina and vermicelli croustades, among others.

The term is derived from the Occitan and Catalan term crostada, and the English term custard derives from it.

Notes

References

Basque cuisine
Catalan cuisine
French pastries
Occitan cuisine